Static Nunatak is a nunatak 2 nautical miles (3.7 km) south-southwest of Altar Mountain, Quartermain Mountains, in Victoria Land. The name is one of a group in the area associated with surveying applied in 1993 by New Zealand Geographic Board (NZGB). Static is a modern survey technique involving stationary observations of survey stations with particular relevance to Global Positioning System (GPS) surveys.

Nunataks of Victoria Land
Scott Coast